The Roman Catholic Diocese of Mpanda is a diocese located in Mpanda in the Ecclesiastical province of Tabora in Tanzania.

History
 October 23, 2000: Established as Diocese of Mpanda from the Diocese of Sumbawanga

Special churches
The Cathedral is the Cathedral of the Immaculate Conception in Mpanda.

Leadership
 Bishops of Mpanda (Roman rite)
 Bishop William Pascal Kikoti (October 23, 2000 – August 28, 2012)
 Bishop Gervas John Mwasikwabhila Nyaisonga (February 17, 2014 - December 21, 2018), appointed Archbishop of Mbeya
 Bishop Eusebius Alfred Nzigilwa (May 13, 2020 -

See also
Roman Catholicism in Tanzania

Sources
 GCatholic.org
 Catholic Hierarchy

Mpanda
Christian organizations established in 2000
Roman Catholic dioceses and prelatures established in the 20th century
Mpanda, Roman Catholic Diocese of
2000 establishments in Tanzania